Bruchmühlbach-Miesau is a Verbandsgemeinde ("collective municipality") in the district of Kaiserslautern, Rhineland-Palatinate, Germany. The seat of the Verbandsgemeinde is in Bruchmühlbach-Miesau.

The Verbandsgemeinde Bruchmühlbach-Miesau consists of the following Ortsgemeinden ("local municipalities"):

 Bruchmühlbach-Miesau
 Gerhardsbrunn
 Lambsborn
 Langwieden
 Martinshöhe

Verbandsgemeinde in Rhineland-Palatinate
Kaiserslautern (district)